The 2017 Capital Football season was the fifth season under the new competition format in the Australian Capital Territory. The overall premier for the new structure qualified for the National Premier Leagues finals series, competing with the other state federation champions in a final knockout tournament to decide the National Premier Leagues Champion for 2017.

League Tables

2017 National Premier League ACT

The 2017 National Premier League ACT season was played over 18 rounds between April and August 2017.

Finals

Top Scorers

Reference:

2017 ACT Capital League

The 2017 ACT Capital League was the fifth edition of the Capital League as the second level domestic association football competition in the ACT. Each team played each other twice for a total of 16 rounds, with the season running from April to September 2017.

Finals

2017 Capital Football Division 1

The 2017 ACT Capital Football Division 1 was the third edition of the Capital League Division 1 as the third level domestic association football competition in the ACT. Each team played each other twice for a total of 18 rounds, with the season running from April to September 2017.

Finals

2017 Women's Premier League 

The highest tier domestic football competition in the ACT is known as the ACT Women's National Premier League (WNPL). Each team played each other three times for a total of 21 rounds, plus a finals series for the top 4 teams.

Finals

Cup Competitions

2017 Federation Cup

2017 was the 55th edition of the Capital Football Federation Cup. The Federation cup acts as the preliminary rounds for the FFA Cup in the ACT with the Cup winner entering the subsequent FFA Cup round of 32. In 2017, the Federation Cup, which was open to all senior men's teams registered with Capital Football, consisted of two rounds, quarter-finals, semi-finals and a final, running from April to June 2017. Olympic won the Cup final 2–0 to lift back-to-back Federation Cups, thanks to a brace from Robbie Cattanach at Deakin Stadium.

Notes:
 † = After Extra Time

2017 Charity Shield
2017 was the second edition of the annual ACT Charity Shield contested to kick off the 2017 Capital Football season. Money raised from the event goes towards a nominated charity, which in 2017 was CanTeen Australia.

See also

Soccer in the Australian Capital Territory
Sport in the Australian Capital Territory

References

Capital Football